Mellifluous is an album by drummer Mel Lewis recorded in 1981 and originally released on the Gatemouth label before being reissued on Landmark Records in 1995 (mistitled Mellifuous) with an additional track.

Reception

Allmusic reviewer Ken Dryden stated "This quintet led by drummer Mel Lewis was actually part of his larger orchestra, so they were high gear by the time of this 1981 recording session".

Track listing
All compositions by Jim McNeely except where noted
 "Blue Note" – 8:02
 "Giving Way" – 4:29
 "Audrey" (Bud Powell) – 7:30
 "I'm Old Fashioned" (Jerome Kern, Johnny Mercer) – 7:22
 "Warm Valley" (Duke Ellington) – 7:45
 "John's Abbey" (Powell) – 5:21
 "Blue Note" [Alternate take] – 10:20 Additional track on CD reissue

Personnel
Mel Lewis – drums
John Mosca – trombone
Dick Oatts – alto saxophone, soprano saxophone, alto flute
Jim McNeely – piano
Marc Johnson – bass

References

Landmark Records albums
Mel Lewis albums
1981 albums
Albums recorded at Van Gelder Studio